Nicholas Valentine Maher (died 18 October 1851) was an Irish Repeal Association politician.

He was the son of Thomas Maher, a medical practitioner, and his wife Margaret. In 1845, he married Margaret Jane Herbert, the daughter of Walter Otway Herbert and Mary Miles.

He was also a member of the Reform Club.

References

External links
 

UK MPs 1841–1847
UK MPs 1847–1852
Members of the Parliament of the United Kingdom for County Tipperary constituencies (1801–1922)
Irish Repeal Association MPs
1851 deaths